Xinqiao is a town of Mouding County in north-central Yunnan province, China, located  northeast of the county seat and  north-northeast of Chuxiong City. , it has 15 villages under its administration.

References 

Township-level divisions of Chuxiong Yi Autonomous Prefecture